Cheilocostus speciosus, or crêpe ginger, is a species of flowering plant in the family Costaceae.  Some botanists have now revived the synonym Hellenia speciosa for this species.

It is native to southeast Asia and surrounding regions, from India to China to Queensland, It is especially common on the Greater Sunda Islands in Indonesia. It is also reportedly naturalized in Puerto Rico, Mauritius, Réunion, Fiji, Hawaii, Costa Rica, Belize, Melanesia, Micronesia, and the West Indies. It is widely cultivated as an ornamental.

Description
Cheilocostus  speciosus and other members of the Costaceae differ from gingers by having only one row of spirally arranged leaves. The species reproduces vegetatively by rhizome, and birds disperse the seeds when they feed on the fruits.

This plant is cultivated in South Asia and Southeast Asia for its medicinal uses, and is cultivated elsewhere as an ornamental. In some areas Cheilocostus  speciosus is introduced and has become an invasive species.

Habitat
The habitat where this species is found is roadside ditches and low-lying areas in tropical forests. Flowering starts after onset of the rainy season.

Human relevance
The plant has many historical uses in Ayurveda, where the rhizome has been used to treat fever, rash, asthma, bronchitis, and intestinal worms. It is mentioned in the Kama Sutra as an ingredient in a cosmetic to be used on the eyelashes to increase sexual attractiveness. It is used to treat kidney problems and other urinary problems in Mizo Traditional Medicine. It was used as a traditional medicine by Malays when evil spirits have possessed a body, as well as for the treatment of high fever, smallpox and as a purgative.

Gallery

References

External links

Horticultural Info
FloriData Info Page

Costaceae
Flora of tropical Asia
Flora of China
Flora of Queensland